Johnny Mathis in Person: Recorded Live at Las Vegas is a live album by American pop singer Johnny Mathis that was recorded at Caesars Palace and released on December 22, 1971, by Columbia Records. All but five of the 23 songs performed had appeared on his studio albums, while the five previously unrecorded songs (described below) have not appeared on a Mathis studio album since. 

The album made its first appearance on Billboard magazine's Top LP's & Tapes chart in the issue dated February 5, 1972, and remained there for seven weeks, peaking at number 128.

Reception

Billboard felt that "Mathis's act is beautifully captured on this two-record set."

Track listing
All tracks were recorded May 20–22, 1971.

Side one
 "In the Morning" (Barry Gibb) – 3:22
 Medley – 4:40  a. "(They Long to Be) Close to You" (Burt Bacharach, Hal David)  b. "We've Only Just Begun" (Roger Nichols, Paul Williams)
 Medley – 4:29  a. "Dreamy" (Erroll Garner, Sydney Shaw)  b. "Misty" (Johnny Burke, Garner)
 "Come Runnin'" (Roc Hillman) – 2:20

Side two
 "(Where Do I Begin) Love Story" (Francis Lai, Carl Sigman) – 3:00
 "April in Paris" (Vernon Duke, E.Y. "Yip" Harburg) – 3:32
 "Day In, Day Out" (Johnny Mercer, Rube Bloom) – 3:01

Side three
 Medley – 8:52  a. "The Twelfth of Never" (Jerry Livingston, Paul Francis Webster)  b. "Wild Is the Wind" (Dimitri Tiomkin, Ned Washington)  c. "When Sunny Gets Blue" (Marvin Fisher, Jack Segal)  d. "It's Not for Me to Say" (Robert Allen, Al Stillman)  e. "Chances Are" (Allen, Stillman)  f. "Love Theme from Romeo and Juliet (A Time for Us)" (Larry Kusik, Nino Rota, Eddie Snyder) g. "Tonight" (Leonard Bernstein, Stephen Sondheim)  h. "Dulcinea" (Joe Darion, Mitch Leigh)  i. "The Impossible Dream (The Quest)" (Darion, Leigh)  j. "Wonderful! Wonderful!" (Sherman Edwards, Ben Raleigh)
 "And Her Mother Came Too" from A to Z (Ivor Novello, Dion Titheradge) – 2:49

Side four
 "I Got Love" from Purlie (Gary Geld, Peter Udell) – 3:34
 "Maria" (Bernstein, Sondheim) – 3:54
 "If We Only Have Love" (Eric Blau, Jacques Brel, Mort Shuman) – 5:05
 "If We Only Have Love" (instrumental) – 1:23

Song information

"In the Morning" was recorded by the Bee Gees in 1966. "Dreamy" had previously been recorded by Erroll Garner, Eileen Farrell, and Sarah Vaughan. Lena Horne included "Come Runnin'" on a live album in 1957. "And Her Mother Came Too" was first performed in the 1921 musical A to Z, and "I Got Love" originated in the 1970 musical Purlie.

Personnel

Johnny Mathis - vocals
Jack Gold - executive producer
Sid Feller - producer
Roy M. Rogosin - conductor
Perry Botkin, Jr. - arranger ("(Where Do I Begin) Love Story")
Jack Elliott - arranger ("Day In, Day Out", "I Got Love")
Allyn Ferguson - arranger ("Come Runnin'")
D'Arneill Pershing - arranger (except as noted)
David Rhodes - arranger ("Maria")
Rafael O. Valentin - engineer
Beverly Parker - photographs
Guy Webster - cover photograph
Morgan Ames - liner notes

References

Bibliography

1972 live albums
Johnny Mathis live albums
albums arranged by Perry Botkin Jr.
albums arranged by Allyn Ferguson
albums produced by Sid Feller
Columbia Records live albums
Albums recorded at Caesars Palace